The Badoon are a fictional reptilian alien species appearing in American comic books published by Marvel Comics. The Badoon Exfulgence are notable for living under strict gender segregation, resulting in two separate societies; the Brotherhood of Badoon (ruled by a "Brother Royal") and the Sisterhood of Badoon (ruled by a Queen).

The Brotherhood live on the planet Moord in the Lomora star system, in the Milky Way, while the Sisterhood reside on the Badoon homeworld of Lotiara (Capella II, also known as "Swampworld"), 42.2 light years from Earth.

Publication history
The Badoon first appeared in Silver Surfer #2 and were created by Stan Lee and John Buscema.

Fictional history

The Badoon Exfulgence is older than the Kree and the Skrulls. There was a natural hatred between the two genders, and they fought each other in long gender wars. The males won and placed the weaker females in captivity. In time, the males further developed technology and abandoned Lotiara, returning only when their mating drive made it necessary. The males became conquerors of worlds, while the females became pacifists, content to remain in peace on their homeworld and ignorant of the males' star-spanning empire.

Among the Brotherhood's conquest attempts are the Zen Whoberi, the Spartax Empire, and the extra-dimensional world of Polemachus. They have been known to form alliances with the Brood (against the Shi'ar and Earth's superhumans), the Kree (against the Skrulls), and Byrrah of Atlantis.  They were also responsible for killing a woman who would have become the universe's greatest peacemaker.

Badoon invasion attempts of Earth have been overcome by the Silver Surfer, Namor, and the New Warriors. They were also opposed by the combined forces of the X-Men, the Fantastic Four and Arkon in order to liberate Arkon's homeworld and prevent an invasion of the Shi'ar empire.

At the time of the Annihilation Wave the Badoon Empire controlled 37.7% of the Milky Way Galaxy. Despite this, the Badoon are considered a minor species. The time traveler Major Victory warned the Guardians of the Galaxy that they need to take the Badoon seriously, as soon they'll become the greatest military threat in the galaxy.

The Inhumans and the Kree later form an alliance with the Badoon alongside the Centaurians, the Dire Wraiths, and the Kymellians. They were put through the same experimental procedure so that they cannot be harmed by the Terrigen Mists. The Badoons' procedure had them going through Amphogenesis upon injecting one drop of the diluted water from the dormant Amphogen (a mutagenic substance). The Badoons were present on Earth's moon upon Black Bolt's return and when the prophecy of the four cities is known.

The Badoon Exfulgence's currency is the Kreull.

Technology

The Brotherhood are capable of faster-than-light space travel and also possess personal cloaking technology. They employ a hand-held particle gun called the "basic weapon." Although males typically wear minimal clothing, some soldiers wear an explosive "frag-thong" that destroys approximately ten surrounding enemies once a Badoon is shot down.

There is also a large, muscular cyborg-like being sometimes used in personal combat called the Monster of Badoon. The Badoon will bolster their forces with Zom soldiers: the corpses of victims turned into cyborg warriors. They are known to use Saturnian Hound-Hawks in the 31st century.

Known Badoons
 Aladi No Eke - Queen of the Badoon contingent of Universal Inhumans.
 Brother Royal - Ruler of the Brotherhood of the Badoon. He commands the Monster of Badoon.
 Czar-Doon - A Badoon that worked with Thanos. In an earlier life, he was a member of Yondu's Ravagers.
 Dara Ko Eke - The daughter of Queen Aladi No Eke is a member of the Universal Inhumans' Light Brigade. She operates under the alias of All-Knowing.
 Drang - Badoon leader of conquering forces of Earth's solar system in the 31st century.
 Droom - Brother Royal of the Badoon Exfulgence in the 31st century.
 Durge - Badoon of the 31st century, who attempted to reconquer Earth by broadcasting "Realitee-Vee" and addicting its inhabitants. 
 Master Ecallaw - The last member of the Intergalactic Alliance of Earth-93112. He mentored Maxam and Zhang to time-travel and kill Adam Warlock, to stop the Magus. 
 Frack - Bounty Hunter on Knot's crew. Twin brother of Frick. 
 Frick - Bounty Hunter on Knot's crew. Twin brother of Frack. 
 Knot - Criminal Bounty Hunter who attempted to gain the Mandalay Gem from an orphanage, but was sucked into the void of space where he probably met his end.
 Kodor - Badoon bounty hunter who trailed the mass murdering Cazon to Earth. He teamed up, with She-Hulk and Jazinda, to convict him. 
 Koord - Governor of Earth, during its occupation in the 31st century. He was killed by Martinex. 
 L'Matto - A Badoon that was one of the hosts to Captain Universe. He wielded the Enigma Power to prevent the Guardians of the Galaxy from exterminating the Badoons.
 L’Wit - The daughter of the Brother Royal. 
 Manat - Ambassador Manat represented the Brotherhood in the Intergalactic Council.
 Maul - Badoon soldier who invaded Jupiter.
 Maz - Badoon soldier who invaded Jupiter. 
 Mud-Ah - A member of Sandorr's Hunters, bounty hunters who attempted to capture the Inhumans. He, along with most of the group of hunters, was killed while retreating. 
 Muer - Soldier, of the Badoon Plutonian invading force, in the 31st century.
 Thumbnail - Mercenary thug who followed Knot as his muscle, they attempted to gain the Mandalay Gem when they probably met their end.
 Tiberius - A badoon orphan who was held captive by his own people. He was freed by Star-Lord as he made his escape.
 Tolaria - Leader of the Sisterhood in the 31st century.
  Voord Bloodeye - Badoon Deity, the god of Beheadings who was killed by Gorr the God Butcher about 500 years ago.
 Y’Gaar - Current Brother Royal of the Badoon Exfulgence. 
 Yur - Badoon of the 31st century who attempted to capture Charlie-27 on Pluto.

Other versions

Earth-691
The Brotherhood are most closely associated with the Guardians of the Galaxy's 'Multiverse' timeline of Earth-691. In this reality, Earth fought a war with them in the 30th century until both Earth and its solar system colonies were conquered in the year 3007, and many races were nearly all wiped out. The Guardians of the Galaxy were made up of different species, and put together by Starhawk. The human Michael Korvac, joined the Badoon and became a cyborg. The Solar System was liberated by the intervention of the Sisterhood in 3014.  Almost all information about the Sisterhood comes from the Guardians of the Galaxy's encounters with them in this timeline. Recent stories as of 2008 have depicted the Sisterhood who exist in the Earth-616 reality as being as warlike as the Brotherhood, suggesting that this origin story does not apply to the "mainstream" version of the Sisterhood.

Earth-93112
In the Earth-93112 timeline, the Badoon Ecclaw was one of the last survivors of the Intergalactic Alliance destroyed by the Magus, who is best known as the mentor of the superhero Maxam.

Avengers Forever
In another timeline, the Badoon were conquered by Kang.

In other media

Television
 The Badoon are mentioned in the Avengers Assemble episode "Hulk's Day Out." The Avengers battle the Badoon-Cylek, a genetic parasitic experiment that the Badoon left behind on the Blue Area of the Moon which was causing weather phenomena on Earth. It was first traced to the moon after a fragment of it was vomited out of the Hulk. During the fight on the Moon, the Hulk was able to defeat the Badoon-Cylek by ripping it out of the Moon.

References

External links
 
 Brother Royal at the Marvel Appendix

Fictional reptiles
Guardians of the Galaxy